Hemel Stags are an amateur rugby league club based in Hemel Hempstead, Hertfordshire. They were semi-professional and played in Betfred League 1 from 2013 until 2018. They withdrew from the professional system when their licence was purchased by Eric Perez and permission was granted by the RFL to relocate it, this would ultimately lead to Cornwall R.L.F.C. entering League 1. The extensive community rugby league teams at Hemel Stags were unaffected As such, Hemel Stags still ran an amateur team at the Southern Conference League East Division in the 2021 season

History

1981–1990: Foundations
Hemel Hempstead Amateur Rugby League Football Club played its first match on 5 April 1981 against the Walthamstow-based McEntee, losing 38–0. It began as a pub team wearing borrowed jerseys. After a series of friendly fixtures during summer 1981, the club was formally constituted and joined the Second Division of the South Amateur Rugby League. The club's original logo featured Henry VIII as the local association football team Hemel F.C. is nicknamed "The Tudors".

During the club's early seasons, success on the field was hard to come by. Nevertheless, the club was determined to prosper and in its fourth season it opened its first social club at Pennine Way in February 1985 – a modest self-build affair. Commercial pressures led to the club leaving the London League division two and joining the Midlands and South West Amateur Rugby League Association (MASWARLA) for the 1986–87 and 1987–88 seasons. This brought playing success and on the club's return to the London Amateur Rugby League it became the dominant force in amateur rugby league in the South of England.

1991–2011: Competitiveness and success
Hemel were London League champions in 1989–90 and 1990–91 and from there joined the Rugby League Alliance in 1991; the club played the reserve teams of professional clubs. At the same time, the club appointed Chris Tate as its first full-time development officer with the task of developing junior and youth players in Hemel. The first Stag logo appeared at this time.

The club spent three seasons in the National Conference League Premier Division between 1993 and 1996. David Ellis coached at the club during the 1993–94 and the 1994–95 seasons. A move to the National Conference League saw the club narrowly miss promotion to the professional ranks in 1993. In 1994, Hemel played London Broncos in the Regal Trophy, leading 18–6 at half-time only to succumb in the final 10 minutes. The club's playing depth that day was emphasised when, in the curtain-raiser, its reserves won the Southern Counties Cup against the all-Kiwi South London Warriors.

Hemel were the last winners of the Southern Cup in 1996, beating London Colonials at Roslyn Park RFC. The club was relegated from the NCL Premier division in 1995–96 finishing bottom, having played 22 won 4 and lost 18. After relegation Hemel resigned, spent a year in the London League then returned to the Rugby League Alliance in 1997. Hemel won the First Division of the Alliance in 1998 under player-coach Jay Turner and would have won promotion to the Super League Alliance but for their lack of a suitable stadium; their plan to build a stadium with National Lottery money having fallen through. The name, Hemel Stags, emerged in the late 90s in place of the cumbersome Hemel Hempstead Amateur Rugby League Football Club.

With the Rugby League Alliance being scrapped and its application for the Northern Ford Premiership rejected again because of their lack of a stadium, Hemel joined the newly formed Rugby League Conference for the 1999 season. After several years in the Rugby League Conference, they entered the newly formed National League 3 in 2003. Although the club lost all of its games in the first season, it progressed steadily and made the 2006 Grand Final under new coach Troy Perkins, losing to Bramley Buffaloes.

In 2006, the club entered the Northern Rail Cup, where the team met local rivals St Albans Centurions as well as the semi-professional clubs London Skolars and Crusaders. Hemel finished in second place in the 2006 league table and qualified for the playoffs for the Grand Final, where they lost to Bramley Buffaloes by 30 points to 8.

The arrival of Callum Irving as community rugby league coach in 2006 revitalised junior rugby league in Hemel and subsequently led to the club joining the Gillette National Youth League in 2008. In September 2008, the club obtained planning permission for a small stadium at Pennine Way and in 2010 the first stage was completed with the enclosure of the ground and the opening of an all-weather training pitch and the floodlighting of the main pitch.

2012–2017: Switch to professional rugby
In February 2012, Hemel was announced as the second side to join an expanded Championship 1 division for the 2013 season. Hemel Stags beat Huddersfield Underbank Rangers 17–10 in the National Conference League Division 3 Grand Final on 29 September 2012.

In the first campaign as a professional team, Hemel Stags finished fifth in the Kingstone Press Championship 1 claiming a play-off place. After defeating Oxford RLFC 30-26 at the Pennine Way Stadium in the first round, Hemel left the competition following a 28-44 loss away to London Skolars.

The 2014 season again seen Hemel Stags challenging for a play-off place, and they are currently in fifth position in the Kingstone Press Championship 1 table.

Hemel Stags finished the regular season of the Kingstone Press Championship 1 in the playoffs places for the second time in their first two seasons of being a semi-professional[rugby league] club. They finished in fifth position with 33 points after drawing 22-22 against Oxford at Iffley Road.

The club has played in a number of leagues over the years, from the London League, MASWARLA, National Conference League and the Alliance League. The dilemma for the club was how to raise standards without the costs of constant trips to the stronger leagues in the North of England.

The club has an active development policy in the town and a number of schools and junior sides are supported by the development officer.

Rugby league has a long history in Hemel schools with some of them having played it for 20 years. The schools' work has produced a number of talented rugby league players, including Dan Sarginson who now plays for the Super League club, Wigan and Kieran Dixon for Hull Kingston Rovers. Jack Howieson and Simon Tillyer played professionally for the Championship club, Sheffield Eagles.

As of the 2017 season, Hemel Stags have moved their training base to Dewsbury, West Yorkshire

2018–2020: Withdrawal from League 1

In October 2018 the club announced that they were withdrawing from league one for 2019 with a view to possibly returning in 2020 and for 2019 the club had applied to join the Southern Conference competition to be launched in the spring of 2019.

On 20 May 2019, the semi-pro franchise of the club was granted approval to relocate to Ottawa, Ontario, Canada, where it was intended will play at TD Place Stadium beginning in 2021. However, the relocated licence was ultimately used by Eric Perez to admit Cornwall R.L.F.C. to League One. Hemel Stags remain active in amateur rugby league.

Seasons

Club honours
 London League: 1988–89, 1989–90, 1990–91
 Southern Cup: 1995
 Rugby League Alliance First Division: 1998
 RLC Eastern Division: 2000
 RLC South Central Division: 2001, 2002
 London Junior League: 2006, 2008
 NCL Division 3: 2012

References

External links
Official site
 Hemel Stags forum on rlfans.com

1981 establishments in England
2018 disestablishments in England
Defunct rugby league teams in England
English rugby league teams
Fan-owned football clubs
Hemel Stags
Rugby clubs established in 1981
Rugby league teams in Hertfordshire